Badminton at the 2000 Summer Olympics was held at the Pavilion 3, Sydney Olympic Park from 17 – 23 September. Both men and women competed in their own singles and doubles events and together they competed in a mixed doubles event.

Medalists

Medal table

Participating nations
A total of 28 nations participated in this event.

References
 2000 Sydney Olympic Games - Tournament Software
 Official Olympic Report

 
2000 Summer Olympics events
2000
Olympcics
Badminton tournaments in Australia